Bradley Lorison Gates (born March 27, 1939) is an American law enforcement official that served as the 11th Sheriff-Coroner of Orange County, California from 1975 until 1999.

Early life
Bradley Lorison Gates was born on March 27, 1939, in Orange, California. He was the third of four children in his family. During his childhood, his family moved to San Juan Capistrano, California where he would later attend Capistrano Union High School. As a teenager, Gates worked as a paperboy, busboy, and a drugstore janitor. He first studied at Orange Coast College before transferring to California State University, Long Beach, where he received a bachelor's degree and master's degree in criminology. He pursued a doctorate at Claremont Graduate University.

Career
Gates first joined the Orange County Sheriff's Department in 1961. With the pending retirement of longtime Sheriff-Coroner Jim Musick, Gates assembled a campaign for the position in 1974. His campaign received endorsements from Musick and actor John Wayne, a resident of Orange County at the time. On June 4, Gates won the election, receiving 29,093 votes and beating the runner-up by over 23,000 votes. While Gates was a sheriff-elect, he was promoted to undersheriff in a unanimous county board vote on July 9. Gates took the office on January 6, 1975, and proposed a reorganization of the sheriff's department the following day.

By 1997, Gates had lost support from several prominent Republicans due to his proposal that taxes be raised in order to alleviate the 1994 Orange County bankruptcy. Republican state senators Rob Hurtt and John Lewis were among several who switched their allegiances to Mike Carona, a police marshal who announced in March 1997 that he would run against Gates. On October 16, Gates announced at a press conference that he would not seek re-election in 1998.

References

1939 births
Living people
California sheriffs
People from Orange, California
People from Orange County, California
People from San Juan Capistrano, California